Hitch (stylized as HITCH) is a 2005 American romantic comedy film directed by Andy Tennant and starring Will Smith in the title role, along with Eva Mendes, Kevin James, and Amber Valletta. The film, which was written by Kevin Bisch, features Smith as Alex "Hitch" Hitchens, a professional "date doctor" who makes a living teaching men how to woo women. Unfortunately, while helping his latest client woo the woman of his dreams, he finds out that his game doesn't quite work on the gossip columnist with whom he's smitten. Columbia Pictures released Hitch on February 11, 2005, and was a box office hit, grossing $371.6 million worldwide.

Plot
Alex "Hitch" Hitchens (Will Smith) is a professional "date doctor" who coaches other men in the art of wooing women, with the main focus of having genuine long-term relationships. He is very successful at what he does.

While coaching one of his clients, Albert Brennaman (Kevin James)—who is smitten with a client of his investment firm, celebrity Allegra Cole (Amber Valletta)—Hitch finds himself falling for Sara Melas (Eva Mendes), a gossip columnist and cynical workaholic. While Albert and Allegra's relationship progresses, Hitch has difficulty connecting with Sara, none of his romantic methods work on her. Throughout the entire process, he keeps his career secret, claiming to be a generic "consultant".

Hitch meets with Vance Munson (Jeffrey Donovan), a shallow misogynist attempting to get Hitch to help him land a one-night stand with Casey Sedgewick (Julie Ann Emery), Sara's coworker and best friend. Although Hitch refuses to help, Vance smugly misleads her into believing that he has used Hitch's services. After finding out Hitch's true identity, Sara publishes an exposé, causing Albert to vandalize a newsstand in rage and get arrested, Allegra breaking up with Albert, and Hitch's reputation to suffer.

At a speed dating event that Hitch sneaks into, Sara and Casey confront him and cite Vance as their source. Hitch explains that not only did he refuse to work with him but also the extent to which women must protect themselves from men like Vance unintentionally makes establishing genuine relationships with good men difficult enough to create a demand for Hitch's services.

After receiving some criticism from Albert about treating love as a job instead of an actually legitimate feeling, Hitch then tries to salvage Albert and Allegra's relationship by confronting her. When she mentions how Albert's quirks won her over, Hitch realizes he does not really do anything significant besides giving his clients confidence and allowing them to get the attention of the women they love. And most of his customers, particularly Albert, really were successful by just being themselves. After Albert mistakenly thinking that Hitch is taking Allegra from him, Allegra reconciles with Albert, and Hitch and Sara repair their relationship.

Albert and Allegra get married, and Hitch helps introduce Casey to a man after she gives the Heimlich maneuver to an elderly woman who was choking on a grape. A dance party then begins with Albert, Allegra, Sara, and Hitch, which ends with Albert accidentally ripping his pants open to do the splits.

Cast
 Will Smith as Alex "Hitch" Hitchens
 Eva Mendes as Sara Melas
 Kevin James as Albert Brennaman
 Amber Valletta as Allegra Cole
 Julie Ann Emery as Casey Sedgewick
 Philip Bosco as Mr.O'Brian 
 Adam Arkin as Max 
 Adam LeFevre as Speed Dating Guy
 Robinne Lee as Cressida Baylor
 Nathan Lee Graham as Geoff
 Michael Rapaport as Ben
 Jeffrey Donovan as Vance Munson
 Paula Patton as Mandy
 Kevin Sussman as Neil
 Ato Essandoh as Tanis

Production
The production budget was $55–70 million. Smith has said that actress Eva Mendes, a Latina, was offered the female lead because the producers were worried about the public's reaction if the part was played by a white actress, creating a studio fear of a potential interracial taboo, or a black actress, creating a studio fear that two black leads would alienate the white audiences. It was believed that a Latina and a black lead would sidestep the issue. Cameron Diaz was originally considered for the role of Sara Melas. Patton Oswalt was considered for the role of Albert Brennaman. The working title of the film was The Last First Kiss, referring to a line that Hitch delivers to Albert, "This could be her last first kiss." Parts of the film were filmed in Morningside Heights, Manhattan, at Columbia University, at Ellis Island, in the Fulton Fish Market, at the Wall Street Bull and the North Cove Marina.

Home media 
The film was released on June 14, 2005 on VHS and DVD by Sony Pictures Home Entertainment. It was one of the first films to employ Sony's ARccOS Protection copy protection. The film was also available on UMD (Universal Media Disc) for the Sony PSP (PlayStation Portable).

Reception
On Rotten Tomatoes, the film has a rating of 69% based on 188 reviews, and an average review of 6.30/10. The site's critical consensus reads, "Despite Hitchs predictability, Will Smith and Kevin James win praise for their solid, warmhearted performances." On Metacritic, the film has a weighted average score of 58 out of 100, based on 36 critics, indicating "mixed or average reviews". Audiences polled by CinemaScore gave the film an average grade of "A" on an A+ to F scale.

Roger Ebert of the Chicago Sun-Times wrote: "The premise is intriguing, and for a time it seems that the Date Doctor may indeed know things about women that most men in the movies are not allowed to know, but the third act goes on autopilot just when the Doctor should be in." Brian Lowry of Variety wrote: "Considerably heavier on romance than comedy, Hitch stitches together relatively few laughs but generates enough goodwill and energy."

Music

Hitch: The Soundtrack was released on September 20, 2005, by Columbia Records. The album reached No. 5 on the Billboard Soundtrack Albums chart and No. 35 on the Billboard 200 chart.

Soundtrack
The soundtrack features artists such as Amerie, Kelly Rowland, Sleepy Brown, Big Boi, Earth, Wind & Fire, Mark Ronson, Martha Reeves and the Vandellas, Omarion, The O Jays, John Legend, The Temptations, Jimmy Cliff and Kevin Lyttle.

Rob Theakston of Allmusic gave the album a three out of five star rating noting that it "features a brilliant survey of soul and R&B over the past three decades." He also proclaimed "while the new tracks are impressive and enjoyable, it's this combination that makes Hitch an enjoyable listen, with something for everyone -- regardless of age -- to enjoy."

TV show
On October 22, 2014, Overbrook Entertainment and Sony Pictures Television began working on a television series adaptation inspired by the film for Fox.

References

External links

 
 
 

2005 films
2005 romantic comedy films
American romantic comedy films
Columbia Pictures films
Films scored by George Fenton
Films directed by Andy Tennant
Films set in New York City
Films set in Columbia University
Overbrook Entertainment films
Films shot in New York City
Films produced by Will Smith
2000s English-language films
2000s American films